Pemberton Urban District was an urban district from 1894 to 1904, when it was added to the County Borough of Wigan. It included the township of Pemberton along with its constituent villages.

References 

Local government in the Metropolitan Borough of Wigan
Districts of England created by the Local Government Act 1894
Urban districts of England
History of the Metropolitan Borough of Wigan